Kotolaname is a village in Kweneng District of Botswana. It is located 30 km west of Molepolole, and the population was 278 in 2001 census.

References

Kweneng District
Villages in Botswana